My Husband's Wives is a 1924 American silent drama film directed by Maurice Elvey, adapted by Dorothy Yost from a scenario by Barbara La Marr, and starring Shirley Mason, Bryant Washburn, and Evelyn Brent. With no prints of My Husband's Wives located in any no film archives, it is a lost film.

Plot
As described in a review in a film magazine, Vale Harvey (Mason) did not care about knowing her husband William's (Washburn) past, so she did not know he had been married before and that Marie Wynn (Brent), an old school chum of hers, had been his wife. She invited Marie to visit her, and the ex-wife immediately began trying to regain William Harvey's affections. The truth finally dawns on Vale and William evicts Marie, who advises Vale to hereafter listen to her future husbands when they start to disclose their pasts.

Cast
 Shirley Mason as Vale Harvey
 Bryant Washburn as William Harvey
 Evelyn Brent as Marie Wynn
 Paulette Duval as Madame Corregio

Production
The film was shot at the Hotel del Coronado in San Diego.

See also
1937 Fox vault fire

References

External links

1924 films
1924 drama films
1924 lost films
Silent American drama films
American silent feature films
American black-and-white films
Films directed by Maurice Elvey
Lost American films
Films with screenplays by Barbara La Marr
Films with screenplays by Dorothy Yost
Lost drama films
Fox Film films
1920s English-language films
1920s American films
Films shot in San Diego